The Carl M. Neuhausen House is a historic house in northeastern Salt Lake City, Utah, United States, that is located within the University Neighborhood Historic District, but is individually listed on the National Register of Historic Places (NRHP).

Description
The house, located at 1265 East 100 South, was designed in Chateauesque style by architect Carl M. Neuhausen and was permitted to be built in 1901.  It was listed on the National Register of Historic Places in 1980.

Carl M. Neuhausen, born 1858 in Stuttgart, Germany, was asserted in the NRHP nomination to have been "the only prominent Utah architect to employ the Renaissance spirit and mannerist detailing of the Chateauesque style."  He worked for a time with architect Richard K.A. Kletting and then split off to work on his own in 1895. He designed several large buildings in Salt Lake City including the Kearns Mansion and the Cathedral of the Madeleine.

Neuhausen died in the house in 1907 of heart failure, at age 49.

The house was listed on the NRHP on October 3, 1980.

See also

 National Register of Historic Places listings in Salt Lake City

References

External links

Houses in Salt Lake City
Châteauesque architecture in the United States
Houses completed in 1901
Houses on the National Register of Historic Places in Utah
Renaissance Revival architecture in Utah
National Register of Historic Places in Salt Lake City